Domenico Svampa (13 June 1851, in Montegranaro, Papal States – 10 August 1907, in Bologna, Kingdom of Italy) was an Italian Roman Catholic prelate and cardinal who served as the Archbishop of Bologna from 1894 until his death.

References

1851 births
1907 deaths
19th-century Italian Roman Catholic archbishops
20th-century Italian cardinals
Cardinals created by Pope Leo XIII
Roman Catholic archbishops of Bologna